Dirge is the second studio album by Singaporean grindcore band Wormrot. It was released on 3 May 2011 by Earache Records. The digital version of the album was released for free download in prior due to an online leak.

Musical style
Compared to the band's previous album Abuse, Dirge is said to feature less of a death metal influence in favor of a punk rock- and crust-indebted sound while still staying firm in their metallic roots. According to Allmusic, the album features 25 songs, "every one a relentless assault of grinding guitar (doubled in the studio to give extra heft), anarchic yet complex drumming, and hoarse, agitated vocals." The shortest track on the record, "You Suffer But Why Is It My Problem", pays tribute to Napalm Death. The track "Deceased Occupation" is driven by a sludgy riff reminiscent of Eyehategod, while the track "Principle of Puppet Warfare" was described as "a pure punk rock slam-fuel."

In an interview with Exclaim!, guitarist Rasyid stated:

Critical reception

Dirge received generally positive reviews from critics. Allmusic critic Phil Freeman wrote that "even as Wormrot's songs blur into a single massive assault, they have a punk rock catchiness that some of the more metallic grindcore acts don't share," concluding: "It's possible to have a favorite Wormrot song, something that can't be said about the legions of lesser grindcore bands out there." Revolvers Chris Krovatin stated: "Vocalist Arif and drummer-singer Fit utilize a twin growl/shriek attack that maintains a sense of violent panic, but it’s guitarist Rasyid’s toxic riffs and overdriven leads that give Wormrot their impressively dark atmosphere, a nihilistic malaise that hangs somewhere south of Pig Destroyer and north of Exhumed." Krovatin also further wrote: "The album is not a crossover darling—the band does little to evolve its sound, and if you don’t particularly like grindcore, you’ll hate this—but within their grimy musical crawlspace, these guys are kicking ass." Greg Pratt of Exclaim! commented: "It's a sound they nail to perfection on this excellent album, which has as its only downfall the monotony that, if history has taught us anything, we know that all classic grind carries with it."

Track listing
All songs written by Wormrot.

Limited edition LP bonus tracks

Personnel
Album credits as adapted from Allmusic:
Wormrot
 Arif — vocals, inlay artwork
 Rashid — guitars
 Fitri — drums
Other personnel
 Ah Boy — engineering, recording, production, mastering
 Andrei Bouzikov — artwork
 Summer Lacy — layout

References

External links
 

2011 albums
Wormrot albums
Earache Records albums
Albums free for download by copyright owner